Antigua and Barbuda fielded two competitors at the 2009 World Championships in Athletics in Berlin. Daniel Bailey placed fourth in the men's 100 metres event, finishing 0.09 seconds behind the bronze medal winner.

Team selection

Track and road events

Results

Men

References

External links
Official competition website

Nations at the 2009 World Championships in Athletics
World Championships in Athletics
Antigua and Barbuda at the World Championships in Athletics